Patti Drew (born December 29, 1944, Charleston, South Carolina) is an American pop singer who achieved brief success in the late 1960s.

Drew was raised in Nashville, Tennessee and Evanston, Illinois, where she sang in church with her sisters, Lorraine and Erma. Drew's mother worked for a Capitol Records promoter, who heard Drew and her sisters sing in a church service and signed the group as the Drew-Vels. They first recorded "Tell Him" which was written by Carlton Black (and not to be confused with "Tell Him" by The Exciters) and featured Black on the record singing bass. The single release was a local pop and R&B hit in 1964 and scraped the lower part of the 'Billboard' pop chart the same year. Two follow-up singles also in 1964 did well in Chicago, "It's My Time" and "I've Known." By 1965 the group had broken up.

Drew signed as a solo artist to Quill Records in 1965 and soon after moved up to Capitol, issuing a new recording of "Tell Him," It was the first of three charting singles on Capitol. She released four albums before leaving the industry in 1971, though she recorded a one-off single in 1975 and sang locally in Evanston in the group Front Line in the 1980s.

Discography

Albums
Tell Him (Capitol, 1967)
Workin' On a Groovy Thing (Capitol, 1968)
Wild Is Love (Capitol, 1969) U.S. R&B #49
I've Been Here All the Time (Capitol, 1969)

Singles

References

External links

American women singers
Living people
Musicians from Charleston, South Carolina
1944 births
Musicians from Nashville, Tennessee
Musicians from Evanston, Illinois
21st-century American women